Ghaffar Jalal (was an Iranian diplomat.

Career
From 1907 to 1920 he was secretary in the Persian Legation in London while his uncle Mehdi Ala al-Saltaneh was Persian minister to the Court of St James's there.

From 1921 to 1922 he was minister in Stockholm.
From 1924 to 1928 he was minister in Cairo.
From 1928 to 1930 he was minister in Rome.
From 1930 to June 12, 1933 he headed the English Section of the Ministry for Foreign Affairs.
On June 12, 1933, he was accredited by Franklin D. Roosevelt.
On Nowruz 1935, the diplomatic corps in Tehran was informed that the official name of Persia from now on was Iran.

Arrest of the Iranian envoy 
On November 27, 1935, after a dispute with the traffic police, he was handcuffed and detained in defiance of his diplomatic immunity.
He was on his way back from New York City to Washington, D.C., when his chauffeur exceeded the speed limit within the City limits of Elkton, Maryland, the diplomat was arrested by American police authorities and the resulting arguments and recriminations were reported by the newspapers of both countries. Iranian interests became care of the Turkish legation.

References 

1880s births
1948 deaths
Iranian diplomats
Ambassadors of Iran to Sweden
Ambassadors of Iran to Egypt
Ambassadors of Iran to Italy
Ambassadors of Iran to the United States
20th-century Iranian people